VDAP may refer to:

Vermont Defendant Accommodation Project, a case study aimed at identifying the needs of mentally retarded criminal defendants
Volcano Disaster Assistance Program, a program that responds to volcanic crises